The Embarrassing Proposal is a 1715-1716 painting by Antoine Watteau. It was part of Heinrich von Brühl's collection in Dresden before being purchased in 1769 under Catherine II of Russia for the Hermitage Museum, in Saint Petersburg, where it still hangs.

It shows a landscape with three young women and two young gallants. X-ray examination has shown the canvas was previously used for a composition with four people, including a woman playing a guitar and a young man, in the position now occupied by the three seated figures.

Exhibition history

References

Bibliography

External links
 An Embarrassing Proposal at the Hermitage's official website
 An Embarrassing Proposal at the Web Gallery of Art

1710s paintings
Paintings in the collection of the Hermitage Museum
Paintings by Antoine Watteau